The "Steamboat Bill" Memorial Bridges are two bridges that span one of the widest points along the Tennessee River within the city of Decatur, Alabama, between Morgan County, and Limestone County. One is a cantilever truss, and the other is a reinforced concrete. The bridges carry US 31, US 72A, and State Route 20 from the intersection of Wilson Street (US 72A, and SR 20), and 6th Avenue (US 31) in northeast Decatur.

Keller Memorial Bridge
The first bridge built here was the William Keller Bridge, completed in 1928. This drawbridge served as the primary until the cantilever truss bridge was built in 1963. The Keller Bridge carried the southbound traffic and the new bridge carried the northbound traffic. As time moved on, the currents of the Tennessee River changed and running barges through the narrow gap created by the drawbridge became more dangerous, and the bridge was hit several times by barges. Also, with the amount of traffic carried by the road, the drawbridge could produce mile-long traffic jams. In 1999 the new concrete bridge opened. Northbound traffic was shifted to the new bridge, southbound traffic was moved to the cantilever bridge, and the Keller Bridge was removed. There are additional pictures and information about the Keller Memorial Bridge available from the Historic American Engineering Record at the Library of Congress.

Routes carried

 US 31
 US 72A
 State Route 20

See also
List of bridges documented by the Historic American Engineering Record in Alabama
List of crossings of the Tennessee River

References

Decatur, Alabama
Bridges over the Tennessee River
Huntsville-Decatur, AL Combined Statistical Area
Decatur metropolitan area, Alabama
Transportation buildings and structures in Morgan County, Alabama
Landmarks in Alabama
Bridges completed in 1928
Bridges completed in 1963
Bridges completed in 1999
Historic American Engineering Record in Alabama
Road bridges in Alabama
U.S. Route 31
U.S. Route 72
Bridges of the United States Numbered Highway System
1928 establishments in Alabama
Cantilever bridges in the United States
Concrete bridges in the United States